The American Expeditionary Forces (A. E. F.) was a formation of the United States Armed Forces on the Western Front during World War I. The A. E. F. was established on July 5, 1917, in France under the command of then-Major General John J. Pershing. It fought alongside French Army, British Army, Canadian Army, New Zealand Army and Australian Army units against the Imperial German Army. A small number of A. E. F. troops also fought alongside Italian Army units in 1918 against the Austro-Hungarian Army. The A. E. F. helped the French Army on the Western Front during the Aisne Offensive (at the Battle of Château-Thierry and Battle of Belleau Wood) in the summer of 1918, and fought its major actions in the Battle of Saint-Mihiel and the Meuse-Argonne Offensive in the latter part of 1918.

Formation

President Woodrow Wilson initially planned to give command of the A. E. F. to Gen. Frederick Funston, but after Funston's sudden death, Wilson appointed Major General John J. Pershing in May 1917, and Pershing remained in command for the rest of the war. Pershing insisted that American soldiers be well-trained before going to Europe. As a result, few troops arrived before January 1918. In addition, Pershing insisted that the American force would not be used merely to fill gaps in the French and British armies, and he resisted European efforts to have U.S. troops deployed as individual replacements in depleted Allied units. 
This approach was not always well received by the western Allied leaders who distrusted the potential of an army lacking experience in large-scale warfare. In addition, the British government tried to use its spare shipping as leverage to bring US soldiers under British operational control.

By June 1917, only 14,000 American soldiers had arrived in France, and the A. E. F. had only a minor participation at the front up to late October 1917, but by May 1918 over one million American troops were stationed in France, though only half of them made it to the front lines. 
Since the transport ships needed to bring American troops to Europe were scarce at the beginning, the U.S. Army pressed into service passenger liners, seized German ships, and borrowed Allied ships to transport American soldiers from the Hoboken Port of Embarkation with facilities in New York City and New Jersey, and  the Newport News Port of Embarkation in Virginia. The mobilization effort taxed the American military to the limit and required new organizational strategies and command structures to transport great numbers of troops and supplies quickly and efficiently. The French harbors of Bordeaux, La Pallice, Saint Nazaire, and Brest became the entry points into the French railway system that brought the American troops and their supplies to the Western Front.

The first American troops, who were often called "Doughboys," landed in Europe in June 1917. However the A. E. F. did not participate at the front until October 23, 1917, when the 1st Division fired the first American shell of the war toward German lines, although they participated only on a small scale. A group of regular soldiers and the first American division to arrive in France, entered the trenches near Nancy, France, in Lorraine.

I Corps was officially activated in France, under the A. E. F., from 15 January 1918. It include the 1st, 2nd, 26th, 32nd, 41st and 42nd Divisions. (4th Brigade, US Marine Corps, was included as part of 2nd Division.) II Corps was activated on 24 February, by which time troop numbers justified it. Initially II Corps consisted of the 27th, 30th, 33rd, 78th and 80th Divisions.

In June 1918, many component infantry units from II Corps – commanded by Maj.-Gen. George W. Read – were attached to veteran British Army or Australian Army units. This served two purposes: familiarizing the Americans with actual battlefield conditions in France, and temporarily reinforcing the British Empire units that were often severely-depleted in numbers, after more than three years of fighting. In fact, the first major operation in World War I to involve US troops concerned individual infantry platoons of the 33rd Division, which were attached to battalions of the Australian Corps for the Battle of Hamel on the 4th of July. Their involvement was voluntary and occurred despite last-minute orders from A. E. F. headquarters, that its troops should not take part in offensive operations led by non-US generals. Thus Hamel was historically significant as the first major offensive operation during the war to involve US infantry and the first occasion on which US units had fought alongside British Empire forces.

The A. E. F. used French and British equipment. Particularly appreciated were the French canon de 75 modèle 1897, the canon de 155 C modèle 1917 Schneider, and the canon de 155mm GPF. American aviation units received the SPAD XIII and Nieuport 28 fighters, and the U.S. Army tank corps used French Renault FT light tanks. Pershing established facilities in France to train new arrivals with their new weapons. 
By the end of 1917, four divisions were deployed in a large training area near Verdun: the 1st Division, a regular army formation; the 26th Division, a National Guard division; the 2nd Division, a combination of regular troops and U.S. Marines; and the 42nd "Rainbow" Division, a National Guard division made up of soldiers from nearly every state in the United States. The fifth division, the 41st Division, was converted into a depot division near Tours.

Logistics

Logistic operations were under the direction of Chicago banker Charles G. Dawes, with the rank first of colonel and then brigadier general. Dawes reported directly to Gen. Pershing.  Dawes recommended in May 1918 that the allies set up a joint logistics planning board, which was approved by the Allies in the form of the Military Board of Allied Supply (MBAS), which coordinated logistics and transportation on the Western and Italian fronts.

Supporting the two million soldiers across the Atlantic Ocean was a massive logistical enterprise. In order to be successful, the Americans needed to create a coherent support structure with very little institutional knowledge. The A. E. F. developed support network appropriate for the huge size of the American force. It rested upon the Services of Supply in the rear areas, with ports, railroads, depots, schools, maintenance facilities, bakeries, clothing repair shops (termed salvage), replacement depots, ice plants, and a wide variety of other activities.

The Services of Supply initiated support techniques that would last well into the Cold War including forward maintenance, field cooking, graves registration (mortuary affairs), host nation support, motor transport, and morale services. The work of the logisticians enabled the success of the A. E. F. and contributed to the emergence of the American Army as a modern fighting force.

African Americans

African Americans were drafted on the same basis as whites and made up 13 percent of the draftees. By the end of the war, over 350,000 African-Americans had served in A. E. F. units on the Western Front. However, they were assigned to segregated units commanded by white officers. One fifth of the black soldiers sent to France saw combat, compared to two-thirds of the whites. They were three percent of A. E. F. combat forces, and under two percent of battlefield fatalities. "The mass of the colored drafted men cannot be used for combatant troops", said a General Staff report in 1918, and it recommended that "these colored drafted men be organized in reserve labor battalions." They handled unskilled labor tasks as stevedores in the Atlantic ports and common laborers at the camps and in the Services of the Rear in France. The French, whose front-line troops were resisting combat duties to the point of mutiny, requested and received control of several regiments of black combat troops. Kennedy reports "Units of the black 92nd Division particularly suffered from poor preparation and the breakdown in command control. As the only black combat division, the 92nd Division entered the line with unique liabilities. It had been deliberately dispersed throughout several camps during its stateside training; some of its artillery units were summoned to France before they had completed their courses of instruction, and were never fully-equipped until after the Armistice; nearly all its senior white officers scorned the men under their command and repeatedly asked to be transferred. The black enlisted men were frequently diverted from their already attenuated training opportunities in France in the summer of 1918 and put to work as stevedores and common laborers."

The 369th, 370th, 371st, and 372nd Infantry Regiments (nominally the 93d Division, but never consolidated as such) served with distinction under French command with French colonial units in front-line combat. The French did not harbor the same levels of disdain based on skin color and for many Americans of African descent it was a liberating and refreshing experience. These African-American soldiers wore American uniforms, some dating from the time of the Union Army, with French helmets and were armed with French Model 1907/15 Berthier rifle  manufactured by Remington Arms, rather than the M1903 Springfield or M1917 Enfield rifles issued to most American soldiers.  One of the most distinguished units was the 369th Infantry Regiment, known as the Harlem Hellfighters. The 369th was on the front lines for six months, longer than any other African-American regiment in the war. One hundred seventy-one members of the 369th were awarded the Legion of Merit. One member of the 369th, Sergeant Henry Johnson, was awarded the French Croix de guerre, and posthumously the Medal of Honor.

Actions during World War I

At the beginning, during the spring of 1918, the four battle-ready U.S. divisions were deployed under French and British command to gain combat experience by defending relatively quiet sectors of their lines. After the first offensive action and American-led A. E. F. victory on 28 May 1918 at the Battle of Cantigny, by the U.S. 1st Division, and a similar local action by the 2nd Division at Belleau Wood beginning 6 June, both while assigned under French Corps command, Pershing worked towards the deployment of an independent US field Army. The rest followed at an accelerating pace during the spring and summer of 1918. By June Americans were arriving in-theater at the rate of 10,000 a day; most of which entered training by British, Canadian and Australian battle-experienced officers and senior non-commissioned ranks. The training took a minimum of six weeks due to the inexperience of the servicemen.

The first offensive action by A. E. F. units serving under non-American command was 1,000 men (four companies from the 33d Division), with the Australian Corps during the Battle of Hamel on 4 July 1918. (Corporal Thomas A. Pope was awarded the Medal of Honor for this battle.) This battle took place under the overall command of the Australian Corps commander, Lt. Gen. Sir John Monash. The Allied force in this battle combined artillery, armor, infantry, and air support (combined arms), which served as a blueprint for all subsequent Allied attacks, using "tanks".

U.S. Army and Marine Corps troops played a key role in helping stop the German thrust towards Paris, during the Second Battle of the Marne in June 1918 (at the Battle of Château-Thierry (1918) and the Battle of Belleau Wood). The first major and distinctly American offensive was the reduction of the Saint Mihiel salient during September 1918. During the Battle of Saint-Mihiel, Pershing commanded the U.S. First Army, composed of seven divisions and more than 500,000 men, in the largest offensive operation ever undertaken by United States armed forces. This successful offensive was followed by the Meuse-Argonne offensive, lasting from September 26 to November 11, 1918, during which Pershing commanded more than one million American and French combatants. In these two military operations, Allied forces recovered more than 200 sq mi (488 km2) of French territory from the German army. By the time the World War I Armistice had suspended all combat on November 11, 1918, the American Expeditionary Forces had evolved into a modern, combat-tested army.

Late in the war, American units ultimately fought in two other theaters at the request of the European powers. Pershing sent troops of the 332d Infantry Regiment to Italy, and President Wilson agreed to send some troops, the 27th and 339th Infantry Regiments, to Russia. These latter two were known as the American Expeditionary Force Siberia, and the American Expeditionary Force North Russia.

Casualties

The A. E. F. sustained about 320,000 casualties: 53,402 battle deaths, 63,114 noncombat deaths and 204,000 wounded. Relatively few men suffered actual injury from poison gas, although much larger numbers mistakenly thought that they had been exposed. The 1918 influenza pandemic during the fall of 1918 took the lives of more than 25,000 men from the A. E. F., while another 360,000 became gravely ill.

Demobilization
After the Armistice of November 11, 1918 thousands of Americans were sent home and demobilized. On July 27, 1919, the number of soldiers discharged amounted to 3,028,487 members of the military, and only 745,845 left in the American Expeditionary Forces.

American Expeditionary Forces University at Beaune
The A. E. F. established the American Expeditionary Forces University at Beaune, complete with its own chapter of Phi Beta Kappa. Faculty included Walter M. Chandler, a Progressive Party member and, later, a Republican Party member of the U.S. House of Representatives from the State of New York.

See also
 Bonus Army
 Formations of the United States Army during World War I

Notes

References

Further reading

 Awards and Decorations: World War I Statistics
 Ayres, Leonard P,  The War with Germany: A Statistical Summary Government Printing Office, 1919 full text online
 Barbeau, Arthur E. and Florette Henri, The Unknown Soldiers: Black American Troops in World War I (Philadelphia: Temple University Press, 1974),
 Beaver, Daniel R. Newton D. Baker and the American War Effort, 1917–1919 (1966)
 CMH Pub 24-1: "Learning Lessons in the American Expeditionary Forces"
 Chambers, John W., II. To Raise an Army: The Draft Comes to Modern America (1987)
 Chapter 17: "World War I: The First Three Years"
 Chapter 18: "World War I: The U.S. Army Overseas" 

Cooke, James J., The Rainbow Division in the Great War, 1917–1919 Praeger Publishers, (1994)
 Dalessandro, Robert J. & Dalessandro, Rebecca S. American Lions: The 332nd Infantry Regiment in World War I (Atglen, Pennsylvania: Schiffer Publishing, 2009)
 Dalessandro, Robert J., & Knapp, Michael G., "Organization and Insignia of the American Expeditionary Forces, 1917–1923" (Atglen, Pennsylvania: Schiffer Publishing, 2008) The best single volume on AEF unit organization.
 Dalessandro, Robert J. & Gerald Torrence, "Willing Patriots: Men of Color in the First World War" (Atglen, Pennsylvania: Schiffer Publishing, 2009)
 Davenport, Matthew J. "First Over There: The Attack on Cantigny America's First Battle of World War I" (New York, Thomas Dunne: 2015)
 Faulkner, Richard S. Pershing's Crusaders: The American Soldier in World War I (U Press of Kansas, 2017). xiv, 758 pp
 Freidel, Frank. Over There (1964), well illustrated
 Grotelueschen; Mark E. Doctrine under Trial: American Artillery Employment in World War I (2001)  (full text version at Google Books)
 Hallas, James H. Doughboy War: The American Expeditionary Force in World War I (2000)
 Heller Charles E. Chemical Warfare in World War I. The American Experience, 1917–1918. Fort Leavenworth, Kan.: Combat Studies Institute, 1984.
 Hirrel, Leo P. "Supporting the Doughboys: US Army Logistics and Personnel During World War I." Ft. Leavenworth, KS Combat Studies Institute, 2017.
 online at no charge
 Holley, I. B. Ideas and Weapons: Exploitation of the Aerial Weapon by the United States During World War I(1983)	
 Howarth, Stephen. To Shining Sea: A History of the United States Navy, 1775–1991 (1991)
 Hurley, Alfred F. Billy Mitchell, Crusader for Air Power (1975)
 James, D. Clayton. The Years of MacArthur, I, 1880–1941. (1970)
 Johnson; Herbert A. Wingless Eagle: U.S. Army Aviation through World War I University of North Carolina Press, (2001)
 Kennedy, David M. Over Here: The First World War and American Society (1982)
 Koistinen, Paul. Mobilizing for Modern War: The Political Economy of American Warfare, 1865–1919 (2004)
 
 Lengel, Edward G., ed. A Companion to the Meuse-Argonne Campaign (Wiley-Blackwell, 2014). xii, 537 pp.
 Millett, Allan Reed. Semper Fidelis: The History of the United States Marine Corps (1991)
 Pershing, John J. Pershing, My Experiences in the World War (1931)
 Smythe, Donald. Pershing: General of the Armies (1986)
 Trask, David F. The United States in the Supreme War Council: American War Aims and Inter-Allied Strategy, 1917–1918 (1961)
  Trask, David F. The AEF and Coalition Warmaking, 1917–1918 (1993) online free
 Van Ells, Mark D. America and World War I: A Traveler's Guide. (Interlink, 2014)
 Venzon, Anne ed. The United States in the First World War: An Encyclopedia (1995)
 Wilson Dale E. Treat 'Em Rough: The Birth of American Armor, 1917–1920 Presidio Press, 1989.
 Woodward, David R. Trial by Friendship: Anglo-American Relations, 1917-1918 (1993) online
 Woodward, David R. The American Army and the First World War(Armies of the Great War) Cambridge University Press, 2014. 484 pp. online review
 
 Yockelson, Mitchell. Forty-Seven Days: How Pershing's Warriors Came of Age to Defeat at the German Army in World War I (New York: NAL, Caliber, 2016) 
 Zeiger; Susan. In Uncle Sam's Service: Women Workers with the American Expeditionary Force, 1917–1919 (1999)

External links

 Government
 Records of the American Expeditionary Forces (World War I) at the National Archives
 General information
 American Expeditionary Forces at UASWW1.com
 
 

 
1917 establishments in France
1920 disestablishments in Washington, D.C.
Disbanded armies
Expeditionary units and formations
Military units and formations of the United States in World War I
Military units and formations established in 1917
Military units and formations disestablished in 1920